Silambam is an Indian martial art originating in Tamilnadu, South India in the Indian subcontinent. This style is mentioned in Tamil Sangam literature. The World Silambam Association is the official international body of Silambam.

Origin
References in the Silappadikkaram and other works of the Sangam literature show that Silambam has been practiced since at least the 4th century BC. It derives from the Tamil word silam, meaning hill. The term silambambu referred to a particular type of bamboo from the Kurinjimala (kurinji hills) in present-day Kerala. Thus silambam was named after its primary weapon, the bamboo staff. It may have earlier used for self-defense and to ward off animals in the Kurinji hills and later evolved into the present-day martial art. Bamboo staffs – as well as swords, pearls and armor – were in great demand from foreign traders. 

The ancient city of Madurai formed as the point of focus of Silambam's spreading. The Silambam staff was acquired by the Egyptians, Greeks and Romans and was spread back to the Middle East, Europe and North Africa. The Tamil Kingdom which encompassed Southern India and Sri Lanka spread it throughout the Southeast Asia.

The Kings Puli Thevar and Dheeran Chinnamalai had armies of Silambam soldiers named "Thadii Pattalam." Veerapandiya Kattabomman, Chinna Maruthu and Periya Maruthu (1760–1799) relied mainly on their Silambam prowess in warfare against the British East India Company. Indian martial arts and other related martial arts practices suffered a decline after the British banned Silambam and promoted modern military training, which favored firearms over traditional weaponry.

Training
The first stages of Silambam practice are meant to provide a foundation for fighting, and also preparatory body conditioning. This includes improving flexibility, agility, and hand-eye coordination, kinesthetic awareness, balance, strength, speed, muscular and cardiovascular stamina.

Weapons

Silambam's main focus is on the bamboo staff. The length of the staff depends on the height of the practitioner. Ideally, it should just touch the forehead about three fingers from the head, typically measuring around 1.68 meters (five and a half feet). Different lengths may be used depending on the situation. For instance, the sedikuchi or 3-foot stick can be easily concealed. Separate practice is needed for staffs of different lengths. Listed below are some of the weapons used in Silambam.

Silambam: staff, preferably made from bamboo, but sometimes also from teak or Indian rose chestnut wood. The staff is immersed in water and strengthened by beating it on the surface of still or running water. It is often tipped with metal rings to prevent the ends from being damaged.
Maru: a thrusting weapon made from deer (more accurately, Blackbuck) horns.
Aruval: sickle, often paired.
Panthukol: staff with balls of fire, or weighted chains on each end.
Savuku: whip.
Vaal: sword, generally curved.
Kuttu katai: spiked knuckleduster.
Katti: knife.
Kattari: native push-dagger with a H-shaped handle. Some are capable of piercing armor. The blade may be straight or wavy.
Surul kaththi: flexible sword.
Sedikuchi: cudgel or short stick, often wielded as a pair.

Kuttu Varisai
Kuttu Varisai is the unarmed combat component of Silambam and also a stand-alone martial art. It contains animal forms.

World initiatives
Silambam made its first historical appearance in the eyes of the world through the auspices of the committee of the United Nations Assembly, which recommended Silambam Asia for United Nations status. The inauguration was held at the United Nations Headquarters in New York, United States on 21 January 2019. However, the China-Taipei government representatives raised questions concerning border conflicts in ancient records pertaining to Silambam. A request was lodged for the organization of Silambam Asia to resolve with ratification of the raised problems by member states. On 30 January 2019, substantive work was completed and concluded for Silambam Asia with Special Status in the United Nations.

In popular culture

In many M.G.Ramachandran (MGR) films from the 1950s and 1960s, MGR had incorporated silambam fighting scenes to popularize these ancient martial arts in the 20th century. MGR himself was a practitioner of silambam fighting, learning this martial art from Master Madurai Maadakulam Ravi. Some of these movies include Thaikkupin Tharam, Periya Idathu Penn, Mugaraasi and Thanipiravi.

See also

Adimurai
Angampora
Banshay
Bataireacht
Bōjutsu
Gatka
Jūkendō
Kalaripayattu
Kbachkun boraan
Kendo
Kenjutsu
Krabi–krabong
Kuttu Varisai
Mardani khel
Silambam Asia
Silat
 Pencak Silat
 Silat Melayu
Tahtib
Thang-ta
Varma kalai
World Silambam Association

References

Dravidian martial arts
Tamil martial arts
Stick-fighting